Luanda is a province of Angola. It covers an area of 18,835 km2, and had a population of 6,945,386 at the Census of 16 May 2014. The latest official estimate (for 2019) is 8,247,688.

The city of Luanda is the capital of the province and Angola. It serves as the country's primary port, cultural and urban centre and occupies 44.8 square miles.

History

The original prewar Luanda Province grew in size during the 20th century due to the urbanization of Angola. It was divided into the provinces of Luanda and Bengo in 1980.

The new reform of 2011 moved the municipalities Icolo e Bengo and Quiçama from Bengo to Luanda Province, so as the province has 3 neighboring ones instead of being surrounded by Bengo. The administrative reform significantly increased the land area of Luanda Province.

Governors
Governors of the Luanda Province have included: Francisca Espírito Santo (c. 2009–2010), Jose Maria dos Santos (c. 2011–2013), and Graciano Francisco Domingos (c. 2014).

Administration
The province has created the Instituto de Planeamento e Gestão Urbana de Luanda (IPGUL, Institute for urban planning and management of Luanda) as an independent organ for urban planning of the province.

Municipalities
The province of Luanda contains seven municipalities:

In 2011 Luanda Province was subdivided into seven municipalities, namely, Luanda, Belas, Cacuaco, Cazenga, Icolo e Bengo, Quiçama and Viana.  In November 2016, another two municipalities were added, Talatona and Kilamba-Kiaxi respectively, giving the province 9 municipalities, 41 urban districts, and 14 communes.

Communes
The province of Luanda contains the following communes; sorted by their respective municipalities:

 Belas Municipality: – Barra do Cuanza, Quilamba (Kilamba); Benfica e Mussulo, Ramiros
 Cacuaco Municipality: – Cacuaco, Funda, Quicolo (Kikolo)
 Cazenga Municipality: – Cazenga, Hoji Ya Henda, Tala Hady; Cazenga Popular, Distrito Industrial
 Ícolo e Bengo Municipality: – Bom Jesus do Cuanza, Cabiri (Kabiri), Caculo Cahango, Calomboloca (seat: Cassoneca), Catete
 Luanda Municipality: – Angola Quiluanje, Ingombota, Maianga, Rangel, Samba, Sambizanga
 Quiçama Municipality: – Cabo Ledo, Demba Chio, Mumbondo, Muxima, Quixinje (Kixinje)
 Viana Municipality: – Calumbo, Viana, Zango, Mbaia
 Kilamba-Kiaxi Municipality: – Quilamba-Quiaxi (Kilamba-Kiaxi); Golfe, Palanca, Sapú, Vila Estoril
 Talatona Municipality: – Benfica, Talatona; Camama, Futungo de Belas, Quificas

List of governors of Luanda

References

External links

 Official Governor of Luanda Province website
 Alternate official Luanda Province government  website—
 Geoview.info: Luanda Province geography info
 Angolan ministry for territorial administration: Luanda Province
  IPGUL.org: Administrative map of Luanda Province with mapping those to old divisions
 IPGUL.org website
 Official City of Luanda website—
 Info Angola.ao: Luanda Province information

 
Provinces of Angola